Klevset or Kløvset is a village in the municipality of Heim in Trøndelag county, Norway. It lies on the shore of Skålvik Fjord along County Road 350. The island of Bårsetøya lies just offshore in the fjord.

A small boatyard, J M Kleivset Båtbyggeri, formerly operated in Klevset. Among other vessels, it built three smacks for use by priests in the reconstruction of Finnmark after the Second World War.

The settlement was attested as Klauset in the 16th century and Kleffßett in 1590 (as well as Kleffset in 1667 and Klefset in 1723). The name is probably derived from Old Norse *kleif 'cliff', referring to its location below a steep hill.

References

External links
Klevset at Norgeskart

Heim, Norway
Villages in Trøndelag